Drew Bartkiewicz is an American businessman, executive, author and serial entrepreneur from Collinsville, Connecticut. He is best known as the founder and CEO of lettrs, an online platform for traditional letter writing. He formerly served as vice president of strategic services at Mashery and vice president of E&O in cyber and new media markets for The Hartford Financial Services Group, where he founded that company's technology and cyber-risk business. He has also been involved with the World Economic Forum's Future of the Internet initiative since 2009.
As CEO, Drew Bartkiewicz signed the first collective bargaining agreement of a messaging network with the Major League Baseball Players association.

Early life
Bartkiewicz is a graduate of the United States Military Academy at West Point with a degree in Aerospace Engineering and Yale University, where he received an MBA. He served as an officer with the United States Army's 82nd Airborne Division during the Gulf War.

Career
Following Bartkiewicz's military career, he served as the vice president for BroadVision's Industry Solutions Group. He later became a director for Salesforce.com's business in Italy, Spain and Portugal. He also served as vice president and lead underwriter for Darwin Professional Underwriter's technology and information liability group, where he created Darwin Professional's Tech/404 product. Darwin Professional is a specialty insurance company.

He was a founder and CEO of CloudInsure, a company that underwrites insurance for cloud computing environments. He was also CEO of CyberRiskPartners, which develops risk management platforms for cloud computing companies. In 2010, Bartkiewicz founded CyberFactors, which provides platforms for the management of cyber risk and liability.

In 2011, Bartkiewicz became vice president of strategic services at Mashery, a provider of API enablement and management services. Intel purchased Mashery in 2013.

In 2012, Bartkiewicz co-founded the social messaging platform lettrs with his wife Araceli. The app has been featured in The Wall Street Journal, Time, BBC, and BusinessWeek. Bartkiewicz also created the lettrs Foundation, an organization that partners with schools and non-profits to improve literacy through social networking. In 2014, Bartkiewicz published Poetguese: A Utopia Where Words Matter, the First Book of lettrs in collaboration with author Paulo Coelho. The book contains a collection of  mobile phone letter correspondences originally written in Portuguese with a foreword by Coelho.

Bartkiewicz's venture Twignature announced partnership with Dr. Harvey W. Schiller as a chairman of the company. In same year his property lettrs was also mentioned as Forbes Top 25 Veteran founded business. He is expanding the Twignature offering to verify, authenticate and "notarize" e-signatures on social networks and emerging currency networks like Blockchain and Bitcoin.
Bartkiewicz was named by Goldman Sachs as One of Top 100 Most Intriguing Entrepreneurs of 2016, joining the company of earlier members, Elon Musk and Jack Dorsey.

Bibliography
Unseen Liability, The Irreversible Collision of Technology and Risk
Unseen Wealth: Report of the Brookings Task Force on Intangibles
Poetguese: A Utopia Where Words Matter, the First Book of Lettrs

Personal life
Bartkiewicz is the son of Barbara and Fred Bartkiewicz. He is married to Araceli Blasco of Madrid, Spain. Together they have two sons and a daughter.

References

External links
Articles by Drew Bartkiewicz
Digital Service Helps Users Share Letters — With One Person Or The Masses

Year of birth missing (living people)
Living people
United States Military Academy alumni
United States Army officers
United States Army personnel of the Gulf War
Yale School of Management alumni
American technology chief executives